The Token (1829–1842) was an annual, illustrated gift book, containing stories, poems and other light and entertaining reading. In 1833, it became The Token and Atlantic Souvenir.

History
The annual was chiefly edited by Samuel Griswold Goodrich (and briefly by Nathaniel Parker Willis), and published in Boston, Massachusetts. Nathaniel Hawthorne contributed, as did Alvan Fisher, Abel Bowen and other writers and artists. In 1833 The Token merged with The Souvenir to become The Token and Atlantic Souvenir, which continued until 1842.

Hawthorne mailed stories to Griswold beginning in the spring of 1829. Goodrich claims he sought Hawthorne's work after reading an anonymous work of his, possibly the novel Fanshawe. The Token included several of Hawthorne's notable early works, including Hawthorne's "My Kinsman, Major Molineux" (1832), "The Minister's Black Veil" (1836), and "The Man of Adamant" (1837). All were published without his name but proved popular. It wasn't until 1837 that Hawthorne's friend Horatio Bridge revealed him as the author in a review of that year's The Token published in the Boston Post. As Bridge wrote: "It is a singular fact that, of the few American writers by profession, one of the very best is a gentleman whose name has never yet been made public, though his writings are extensively and favorably known."

References

Further reading
The Token: a Christmas and New Year's Present. 1830;  1831.
The Token and Atlantic Souvenir: a Christmas and New Year's Present. 1833;  1835;  1837;  1840;  1842.

External links

1829 establishments in Massachusetts
1842 disestablishments in Massachusetts
Annual magazines published in the United States
Defunct literary magazines published in the United States
Literary annuals
Magazines established in 1829
Magazines disestablished in 1842
Magazines published in Boston